WIDA (1400 AM, "Vida AM") is a radio station licensed to serve Carolina, Puerto Rico.  The station is owned by Primera Iglesia Bautista de Carolina, through licensee Radio Vida Incorporado. It airs a Spanish language Christian radio format.

The station was assigned the WIDA call letters by the Federal Communications Commission on September 1, 1980.

On September 20, 2017, the station's transmitter site was heavily damaged by Hurricane Maria and on October 10, the diesel generator was stolen. The station returned to the air on November 30, 2019, after two years off the air and the transmitter repairs have been completed.

References

External links
WIDA official website

IDA
Radio stations established in 1964
Carolina, Puerto Rico
1964 establishments in Puerto Rico